The stay-at-home daughter (SAHD) movement is a subset of the biblical patriarchy and biblical womanhood movements, particularly within the United States and New Zealand. Adherents believe that "daughters should never leave the covering of their fathers until and unless they are married." This means preparing to be a wife and mother, as well as eschewing a university education. For most stay-at-home daughters this involves a focus on the "domestic arts" such as cooking, cleaning and sewing. The movement, however, emphasizes women who are "educated, empowered, and strong". It has been suggested that the purpose of stay-at-home daughters is to "learn to assist their future husbands as helpmeets in their exercise of dominion by practicing that role in their relationship with their father."

The key pioneers of this movement are the Botkin sisters, Anna Sofia and Elizabeth, who in 2005 wrote So Much More: The Remarkable Influence of Visionary Daughters on the Kingdom of God. The Botkins have noted, however, that "Christian Young Womanhood" is "not about staying at home".

References

Christian movements
Christianity and women
Complementarianism